Al-Khalil is the Arabic name for Hebron, a city in the southern West Bank.

Al-Khalil may also refer to:

People
Al-Khalil ibn Ahmad al-Farahidi (718 – 786), lexicographer and leading grammarian of Basra, Iraq
Al-Khalil family

See also
 Khalil (disambiguation)
 Khalili (disambiguation)